Prorella artestata is a moth in the family Geometridae first described by John Arthur Grossbeck in 1908. It is found in the US states of Arizona and Texas.

The wingspan is about 17 mm. The forewings are smoky brown with oblique dark crosslines. Adults have been recorded on wing in August and September and from May to June.

References

Moths described in 1908
Eupitheciini